Bani Afghan ( - children of Afghan) is a village located in Mianwali District of Punjab Province in Kala Bagh ( "Garden of the Citadel") in Pakistan. The village contains an elementary school.

History
Bani Afghan's residents are indigenous residents in Punbjab they have not been among refugees for the past forty years related to the coups in Afghanistan in the 1970s or since the Soviet occupation since the 1980s. The camps of the Afghan refugees are marked even in Khyber Paktunkhwa in Urdu and English. Refugees still live today, but there are various cities in Multan, Mardan on another cities of Pakistan and before 1947 in India, indigenous peoples of the Afghans or Pashtuns, who are mainly referred to in the Indian subcontinent as Rohilla or Pathan: Roh (Sanskrit) means high or peaks of the mountains and Rohilla means residents who live on high mountains. Pathan means man who is reliable. Pashtuns means sitting on the horse: rider. This people with four names (Afghan, Pathan, Rohilla and Pashtun) have lived in Iranian and Indian cultural areas for centuries and have also ruled in both cultures. Sher Shah Suri  (1486 – 22 May 1545) or Sado Khan (11 October 1558 in Multan, died on 18 March 1627 in Kandahar ruled in India and also in Iran. Sado Khan was the ancestor of Dowlat Khan, grandfather of Ahmad Khan Abdali (founder of the Durrani dynasty).

Other localities and cities in India and Pakistan
 Kala Afgana  ( "the Afgana Citadel")
In India's history, was Nawab or rulers built such large buildings as fortresses or Cidalel. In Persian called Dazh or Arg.
 Nakkah Afghan Punjab, Pakistan
 Kiri Afghānān Punjab India
 Injra Afghan
 Afghan Kachi Basti Pakistan 
 Daman Afghani Pakistan
 Bhati Afghana Narowal, Punjab, Pakistan
 Afghana (Jhelum) Punjab
Fatehpur Afghanan

See also
 Afghana
 Bene Israel in Indien
 Maghzan-e-Afghani

Afghan refugee camps in Pakistan 
 Afghan Refugees Camp, Pakistan  Khyber Pakhtunkhwa
 Afghan Mahajrin Camp  Immigrants, Pakistan
 Kalkatak Afghan Refugees Camp, Pakistan 
 Khairabad Afghan Rafugees Camp, Pakistan 
 Afghan Refugees Camp Number One, Balochistan, Pakistan  
 Afghan Refugees Camp Number Five, Balochistan, Pakistan 
 Afghan Mahajarin Camp - Balochistan, Pakistan 
 Khairabad Afghan Rafugees Camp Pakistan

Books
Richardson, John. (1777).<ref>[https://books.google.com/books?id=1O9LAAAAcAAJ&dq=afghan+lamentation&pg=PA87 A Dictionary, Persian, Arabic, and English ]</ref> A Dictionary, Persian, Arabic, and English.'' Oxford: Clarendon Press. 
 Adamec, Ludwig W: The A to Z of Afghan Wars, Revolutions and Insurgencies , 
 Frank Clements, Ludwid W. Adamec: Conflict in Afghanistan: A Historical 1.ed. Santa Barbara, 1942,

References 

Populated places in Mianwali District
Pashtun people
Pashtun tribes